"Est-ce que tu m'aimes?" (English: "Do You Love Me?") is a song by Congolese-French singer and rapper Maître Gims from the album Mon cœur avait raison.

Music video
The music video was released on 4 May 2015. Filmed in Paris and New York, it shows people in various phases of their often difficult relationships. Some interior scenes were filmed at the Guimet Museum. The video has more than 400 million views on YouTube as of January 2021.

Charts

Weekly charts

Year-end charts

Certifications

References 

2015 singles
2015 songs
French-language songs
Gims songs
Number-one singles in Italy
Songs written by Renaud Rebillaud